Trachelyopterus fisheri is a freshwater demersal fish native to the Sucio River in Colombia. Synonyms are Parauchenipterus fisheri and Trachycorystes fisheri. Common names  are Fisher's woodcat or driftwood catfish.

It is the most slender of all of the Trachelyopterus species. Another feature that helps identity it is the terminal mouth, other Trachelyopterus species have a slightly high-level mouth.

The species is found in the tropical aquarium fish trade, though is not popular. It is listed in the "least concern" category of the IUCN Red List.

References

Auchenipteridae 
Fish of South America
Fish described in 1916